Asher Hollow is a valley in Phelps County, Missouri. It was named for the local Asher family.

References

Valleys of Phelps County, Missouri
Valleys of Missouri